Norton is a constituency of the National Assembly of the Parliament of Zimbabwe. It is currently represented by Temba Mliswa, an independent.

Members

References

External links 

 Norton constituency profile

Constituencies established in 2008
Mashonaland West Province
Norton, Zimbabwe
Parliamentary constituencies in Zimbabwe
2008 establishments in Zimbabwe